A Mother's Love may refer to:

 A Mother's Love (1929 film), a 1929 German silent drama film
 A Mother's Love (1939 film), a 1939 German drama film
 A Mother's Love (1950 film), a 1950 Japanese drama film
 "A Mother's Love", an episode of Folklore